Parafuscoptilia is a genus of moths in the family Pterophoridae, containing only one species, Parafuscoptilia tibuliformis. It was described in 2005 by Shu-Lian Hao and Hou-Hun Li from specimens collected in Fujian, China.

References

Exelastini
Monotypic moth genera
Moths of Asia